Chaenogobius is a genus of gobies native to Asia and the western Pacific Ocean.

Species
There are currently two recognized species in this genus:
 Chaenogobius annularis T. N. Gill, 1859 (Forktongue goby)
 Chaenogobius gulosus (Sauvage, 1882)

References

Gobionellinae